The 2013 Catalunya GP3 Series round was a GP3 Series motor race held at the Circuit de Catalunya in Montmeló, Spain on 11 and 12 May 2013 as the first round of the 2013 GP3 Series season. This is the debut of the GP3 Series' second-generation chassis, the Dallara GP3/13. The race was used to support the 2013 Spanish Grand Prix.

Tio Ellinas inherited pole position in the GP3 Series feature race when pole-sitter Kevin Korjus was given a grid penalty, and he went on to win the race. Aaro Vainio won the sprint race, leading home team-mate Korjus to give team Koiranen GP the lead in the teams' championship in after their first GP3 Series round.

Classification

Qualifying

Notes:
 — Kevin Korjus qualified on pole, but was given a ten-place grid penalty for ignoring yellow flags during free practice. Tio Ellinas was recognised as the pole-sitter for the event.
 — Alex Fontana, Carlos Sainz Jr. and Patrick Kujala all received ten-place grid penalties for ignoring yellow flags during free practice.
 — Daniil Kvyat was given a three-place penalty for blocking Conor Daly during qualifying.

Feature race

Notes:
 — Facu Regalia retired from the race, but was classified as a finisher as he had completed 90% of the winner's race distance.

Sprint race

Notes:
 — David Fumanelli and Robert Visoiu had twenty seconds added to their race time in lieu of a drive-through penalty after they were found to have caused avoidable accidents during the race.
 — Carlos Sainz Jr. was disqualified from the race after his car was found to be underweight during scrutineering.

Standings after the round

Drivers' Championship standings

Teams' Championship standings

 Note: Only the top five positions are included for both sets of standings.

See also 
 2013 Spanish Grand Prix
 2013 Catalunya GP2 Series round

References

Catalunya
Catalunya